Tromelin may refer to:

Places 
 Tromelin Island, an island in the Indian Ocean

People 
 Bernard-Marie Boudin de Tromelin (1735–1815), French Navy officer
 Maurice Boudin de Tromelin de Launay (1740–1825), French Navy officer
 Jacques Marie Boudin de Tromelin de La Nuguy (1751–1798), French Navy officer
 Jacques Boudin de Tromelin (1770–1842), French Brigade general of the First French Empire